Reefer City is a ghost town in Kern County, California. Reefer City still appeared on maps as late as 1947.

Reefer City was established in June 1936 by Consolidated Gold Fields of South Africa, formerly Gold Fields of South Africa Limited, a company founded and based in London, after a gold lode was discovered on Soledad Mountain near Mojave. The company purchased refrigerator cars, known colloquially as "reefers", from the Southern Pacific Railroad to house the miners. After the mine closed in 1942, the community housed military personnel from Edwards Air Force Base until the 1960s. In 1971, Reefer City was purchased and demolished by a salvage company.

References

Former settlements in Kern County, California
Former populated places in California
Populated places established in 1933
Populated places disestablished in 1971